Rosie Elliott (born 6 November 1997) is a New Zealand sprinter with national and Oceania titles at 400 metres, the national record at 200 metres and who represented her country at the 2022 World Athletics Championships.

Career

Studies and racing
A promising junior racer, Elliott stepped away from the sport and moved to Dunedin for four years to study anatomy at the University of Otago. She found her way back to athletics, and a move back north to Christchurch. Although she had been accepted back in Dunedin to study physiotherapy, Elliott ran under 12 seconds for the 100m in October 2019
putting her second in the national
rankings behind only Zoe Hobbs. Competing again at sprint races Elliott won silver medals at the New Zealand national championships in 2020 in both the 100m and 200m races, before a slew of injuries curtailed her 2021 season.

Step up to 400m
She stepped up to 400m in February 2022 and went on a winning streak that brought her close to the national record 400m time, and included wins in the New Zealand national championships, the Oceania Championships and qualification for the 2022 World Athletics Championships held in Eugene, Oregon.

2023 new PBs and national record
On 28 January 2023 Elliott ran a new personal best time for the 400m of 52.16 at the Cook’s Classic in Whanganui. On February 19, 2023 she set a new national record in the 200m running 22.81 at the International Track Meet in Christchurch. At the same meet she equalled her personal best in the 100m to win that race in 11.57.

References

Living people
 1997 births
New Zealand female sprinters
World Athletics Championships athletes for New Zealand